Edwin Arend Perkins,  (born 31 August 1953) is a Canadian mathematician who has been Professor of Mathematics at the University of British Columbia since 1989 and Canada Research Chair in Probability since 2001.  He was elected to the Royal Society of Canada in 1988 and to the Royal Society in 2007. He won the 2003 CRM-Fields-PIMS prize.

He obtained his PhD in 1979 under the supervision of Frank Bardsley Knight at the University of Illinois at Urbana–Champaign with a dissertation titled 'A Nonstandard Approach to Brownian Local Time'.

References

1953 births
Fellows of the Royal Society
Fellows of the Royal Society of Canada
Academic staff of the University of British Columbia
Canada Research Chairs
Living people
Probability theorists